Jyoti Singh is a US-based actress of Indian origin. She is also the director of Yadvi - The Dignified Princess, a biopic on Maharani Yaduvanshi Kumari, the daughter of Maharaja Bhupinder Singh of Patiala.

Early life 
Jyoti Singh lived with her grandmother, Maharani Yaduvansh Kumari, till she was 13 years old. After that, she along with her mother and sisters moved to the United States of America.

Career
After working as an actress for close to a decade, Jyoti Singh turned a director with Yadvi the Dignified Princess, which went on to be screened at numerous film festivals across the world.

The film got positive to mixed reviews across board.

As an actress Jyoti has worked on NBC mini series The Slap and the Bollywood movie Mirror Game.

References

External links
 

Living people
Actresses from Uttarakhand
Year of birth missing (living people)